Once There Was a War is a 1966 Danish drama film directed by Palle Kjærulff-Schmidt. The film was selected as the Danish entry for the Best Foreign Language Film at the 40th Academy Awards, but was not accepted as a nominee.

Cast 
 Ole Busck as Tim
 Kjeld Jacobsen as The Father
 Astrid Villaume as The Mother
 Katja Miehe-Renard as Kate
 Birgit Bendix Madsen as Jane
  as Bedstefaderen
 Yvonne Ingdal as Lis
 Karen Marie Løwert as Lis' mor
 Gregers Ussing as Frank
 Jan Heinig Hansen as Markus
 Birgit Brüel as Markus' mor
 Jørgen Beck as Vennen
  as Vennens kone
  as Rektor
  as Gymnastiklærer

See also 
 List of submissions to the 40th Academy Awards for Best Foreign Language Film
 List of Danish submissions for the Academy Award for Best Foreign Language Film

References

External links 
 

1966 drama films
1966 films
Danish black-and-white films
Danish drama films
1960s Danish-language films
Films directed by Palle Kjærulff-Schmidt
Danish World War II films